Martin Kokkelkoren (born 14 April 1969) is a Dutch racing cyclist. He rode in the 1992 Tour de France.

References

1969 births
Living people
Dutch male cyclists
Place of birth missing (living people)